São João Baptista is a freguesia (civil parish) of Cape Verde. It covers the larger, southern part of the municipality of Porto Novo, on the island of Santo Antão.

Subdivisions
The freguesia consists of the following settlements (population at the 2010 census):

Agua dos Velhos (pop: 60)
Bolona (pop: 112)
Casa do Meio (pop: 36)
Catano (pop: 266)
Chã de Morte (pop: 746)
Cirio (pop: 476)
Curral das Vacas (pop: 335)
João Bento/Ribeira dos Bodes (pop: 162)
Lagoa (pop: 358)
Lagoa de Catano (pop: 257)
Lajedo (pop: 558)
Lombo das Lanças (pop: 40)
Lombo de Figueira (pop: 281)
Manuel Lopes (pop: 43)
Mato Estreito (pop: 58)
Morro Vento (pop: 107)
Pedra de Jorge (pop: 55)
Pico da Cruz (pop: 101)
Porto Novo (pop: 9,310, city)
Ribeira Fria (pop: 198)
Ribeira Torta (pop: 11)
Ribeirão Fundo (pop: 45)
Tabuga (pop: 9)
Tarrafal de Monte Trigo (pop: 841)

References

Porto Novo Municipality
Parishes of Cape Verde